North West District was a district command of the British Army from 1967 and 1991.

History

The district was formed from 42nd (East Lancashire) Infantry Division as part of the Territorial Army Volunteer Reserve in 1967. It had its headquarters at Cuerden Hall, and was placed under the command of HQ UK Land Forces in 1972. In 1991, the first of the minor districts to be amalgamated were North West District, the former West Midlands District (by then Western District) and Wales, to form a new Wales and Western District.

Commanders
General officers commanding included:
1967–1968 Major-General Bala Bredin
1968–1970 Major-General Charles Dunbar
1970–1972 Major-General James Wilson
1972–1974 Major-General Corran Purdon
1974–1977 Major-General Keith McQueen
1977–1980 Major-General Peter Sibbald
1980–1983 Major-General Michael Hicks
1983–1986 Major-General Philip Davies
1986–1989 Major-General Colin Shortis
1989–1991 Major-General Tony Crowfoot

References

Districts of the British Army
Military units and formations established in 1967
Military units and formations disestablished in 1991